Oligophlebia igniflua is a moth of the family Sesiidae. It is only known from the Brisbane district in Queensland, but the distribution of its known host-plant suggests that it will ultimately be found to occur in other rainforest areas in Queensland and the Northern Territory.

The length of the forewings is about 6 mm for males and 6–7 for females.

The larvae tunnel the trunk of the rainforest tree Elaeocarpus grandis. Pupation takes place in the bark.

External links
Australian Faunal Directory
Moths of Australia
Classification of the Superfamily Sesioidea (Lepidoptera: Ditrysia)

Moths of Australia
Sesiidae
Moths described in 1893